Bogobiri House is an African-themed boutique hotel and restaurant located in Ikoyi, Lagos.

Description and decor 
Bogobiri house is made up of two buildings, each housing a restaurant and a set of guest rooms. The furnishing and interiors of the restaurant consists mainly of artistic and rustic ornament and furniture, including chairs, cushioned benches, sofas, tables and stools with heavy sculptures of African reliefs and patterns and made from a mix of raw timber, straw, jute, rocks and leather materials sourced from within the country. There are also bars, an art gallery and corners for live jazz bands within the restaurants.

References

External links

Cultural venues in Lagos
Restaurants in Lagos
Hotels in Lagos
Music venues in Lagos